Woll is a surname. Notable people with the surname include:

 Adrián Woll (1795–1875), French soldier
 Balthasar Woll, (1922–1996), Oberscharführer in the Waffen SS 
 Deborah Ann Woll (born 1985), American actress best known for her role as Jessica Hamby on HBO's True Blood
 Ed Woll (1914–2010), American engineer who developed the first modern gas turbine engines for General Electric
 Erna Woll (1917–2005), German composer, church musician and author
 Felicitas Woll (born 1980), German actress best known for the ARD-Series Berlin, Berlin
 Joseph Woll (born 1998), American ice hockey player
 Matthew Woll (1880–1956), president of the International Photo-Engravers Union of North America

German-language surnames